William Dowell (21 May 1885 – 9 November 1949) was a Welsh dual-code international rugby union and rugby league footballer who played rugby union for Newport and Pontypool and rugby league with Warrington RLFC (Heritage № 151). He won seven caps for the Wales rugby union team and after switching to league, played one match for the Wales league squad.

Rugby career
Dowell first played for Newport in 1905 and was part of the team that faced two touring sides; the 1905 Original All Blacks, and the 1906 South Africans.

Dowell was first capped for Wales on 12 January 1907 when he played against England at St. Helens under the captaincy of Dicky Owen. It was a good victory for Wales, winning 22-0 and Dowell was back the very next two matches of the 1907 Home Nations Championship. Dowell was also part of the Wales Triple Crown winning team when he played in all three games of the 1908 Championship, including a winning match against France in the same year. His final four union international games were with Pontypool after he left Newport in 1908. Dowell may have been selected the next season but 'Went North', joining rugby league team Warrington and therefore making himself ineligible to play further union games. He later played one league international for Wales making him a dual code international.

Dowell played left-, i.e. number 8, in Warrington's 10-3 victory over Australia in the 1908–09 Kangaroo tour of Great Britain tour match during the 1908–09 season at Wilderspool Stadium, Warrington, Saturday 14 November 1908, in front of a crowd of 5,000, due to the strikes in the cotton mills, the attendance was badly affected, the loss of earnings meant that some fans could not afford to watch the first tour by the Australian rugby league team.

International matches played
Wales (union)
  1907, 1908
  1908
  1907, 1908
  1907, 1908

Wales (league)
  1908

Bibliography

References

1885 births
1949 deaths
Dual-code rugby internationals
Newport RFC players
Pontypool RFC players
Rugby league players from Pontypool
Rugby union players from Pontypool
Rugby union wings
Wales international rugby union players
Wales national rugby league team players
Warrington Wolves players
Welsh miners
Welsh rugby league players
Welsh rugby union players